Miguel Fernández (born 17 February 1969) is a Spanish former cyclist. He competed in the team time trial at the 1992 Summer Olympics.

References

External links
 

1969 births
Living people
Spanish male cyclists
Olympic cyclists of Spain
Cyclists at the 1992 Summer Olympics
Cyclists from the Region of Murcia